The 1936 Providence Friars football team was an American football team that represented Providence College as an independent during the 1936 college football season. In their third year under head coach Joe McGee, the team compiled a 1–7 record.

Schedule

References

Providence
Providence Friars football seasons
Providence Friars football